Carmen Mónica Trustée Lee (born July 16, 1948) is a retired track and field athlete from Cuba, who competed in the 400 and 800 metres during her career. She represented her native country at the 1972 Summer Olympics in Munich, West Germany.

References
 

1948 births
Living people
Cuban female sprinters
Cuban female middle-distance runners
Athletes (track and field) at the 1972 Summer Olympics
Athletes (track and field) at the 1971 Pan American Games
Olympic athletes of Cuba
Pan American Games silver medalists for Cuba
Pan American Games medalists in athletics (track and field)
Universiade medalists in athletics (track and field)
Central American and Caribbean Games gold medalists for Cuba
Central American and Caribbean Games silver medalists for Cuba
Competitors at the 1970 Central American and Caribbean Games
Competitors at the 1974 Central American and Caribbean Games
Universiade silver medalists for Cuba
Central American and Caribbean Games medalists in athletics
Medalists at the 1970 Summer Universiade
Medalists at the 1973 Summer Universiade
Medalists at the 1971 Pan American Games
Olympic female sprinters
People from Banes, Cuba
21st-century Cuban women
20th-century Cuban women